Aseelahella is a genus of branching alga that falls within the coralline stem group.

Fossil algae